German submarine U-2511 was a Type XXI submarine of Nazi Germany's Kriegsmarine during World War II. The Elektroboot submarine was laid down on 7 July 1944 at the Blohm & Voss yard at Hamburg, launched on 2 September 1944, and commissioned on 29 September 1944 under the command of Kapitänleutnant Adalbert Schnee.

Design
Like all Type XXI submarines, U-2511 had a displacement of  when at the surface and  while submerged. The submarine was powered by two MAN SE supercharged six-cylinder M6V40/46KBB diesel engines each providing , two Siemens-Schuckert GU365/30 double-acting electric motors each providing , and two Siemens-Schuckert silent running GV232/28 electric motors each providing .

U-2511 was fitted with six  torpedo tubes in the bow and four  C/30 anti-aircraft guns. She could carry 23 torpedoes or 17 torpedoes and 12 naval mine. The complement was five officers and 52 men.

Service history
After training with 31st U-boat Flotilla, U-2511 was transferred to 11th U-boat Flotilla at Bergen, Norway, for front-line service on 15 March 1945.

U-2511 conducted one patrol. On the evening of 30 April 1945 (coincidentally the date of Hitler's death), U-2511 set out from Bergen, Norway for the Caribbean, but on 4 May Schnee received the end-of-the-war cease-fire order. The commander of U-2511 claimed the U-boat had a British cruiser in her sights on 4 May when news of the German cease-fire was received. He further claimed she made a practice attack before leaving the scene undetected.

Fate
On 17 June 1945, U-2511 was transferred from Bergen, and arrived at Londonderry Port on 21 June for Operation Deadlight. The U-boat was sunk on 7 January 1946 at 7:40 pm in position . She was sunk by gunfire after her towing cable parted.

The wreck lies at a depth . She had been visited by divers at least three times, in 1999 and 2001, and circa 2012 for 'Dig WW2 with Dan Snow', revealing she is largely intact except for a large blast hole caused by the shellfire that sank her.

References

Bibliography

External links
 
Researched scale model representation of U-2511 
New U-Boats

World War II submarines of Germany
Type XXI submarines
U-boats commissioned in 1944
U-boats scuttled in 1946
Operation Deadlight
1944 ships
Ships built in Hamburg
Maritime incidents in 1946